White House is a settlement in Westmoreland Parish, Jamaica, with some 4,000 residents, known traditionally for its fishing industry, which provides fresh seafood to businesses across Jamaica.

Tourism
After recent investment to promote tourism, the area is now visited by many Jamaican and foreign tourists. Attractions include a village tour and excursions east of the town to, for example, Whitehouse Beach, Font Hill Wildlife Sanctuary, safaris on the Black River and Y.S. Falls.

References

Populated places in Westmoreland Parish